The Philippine Sailing Association is the governing body for the sport of sailing in Philippines, recognised by the International Sailing Federation. The Organization hosts and sanctions local competitions such as the Optimist Championship Sailing Reggata, Tali Beach Sailing Festival and the Philippine Hobie 16 Competition. The PSA also sends competitors to international competitions such as the Southeast Asian Games.

See also
 Philippines at the Olympics
 Sports in the Philippines

References

External links
 Philippines at the ISF

National members of World Sailing
Sailing
Sailing governing bodies